Carmarthen Town North was an electoral ward, representing part of the community of Carmarthen, Carmarthenshire, Wales.

Profile
In 2014, the Carmarthen Town North electoral ward had an electorate of 3,984. The total population was 5,151, of whom 77.1% were born in Wales. The 2011 census indicated that 37.4% of the population were able to speak Welsh.

History
Carmarthen Town North was an electoral ward since the 1937. It was previously known as Carmarthen Town No.1 Ward. It became a two-member electoral ward for the purposes of elections to Carmarthenshire County Council. The corresponding North ward elects seven members to Carmarthen Town Council.

From 1973 until 1996 it was a single-member ward for the purposes of elections to Dyfed County Council and a four-member ward for elections to Carmarthen District Council.

From 1937 until 1973 it was a single-member ward for the purposes of elections to the previous Carmarthenshire County Council.

Following a boundary review by the Local Democracy and Boundary Commission for Wales, Carmarthen Town North was merged with Carmarthen Town South to be called Carmarthen Town North and South, effective from the May 2022 local elections. The new ward saw an overall reduction in councillors from four to three.

Carmarthenshire County Council elections

1995
In 1995, Ken Maynard, a Labour member of Dyfed County Council since 1985 and David Merriman, an Independent member of Carmarthen District Council since 1976 were elected as the ward's first representatives on the new Carmarthenshire County Council.

1999
In 1999, both sitting members were re-elected but were closely challenged by Plaid Cymru candidate Llyr Huws Griffiths.

2004
At the 2004 election, Ken Maynard, a county councillor since 1985 stood down and David Merriman, a district and county councillor since 1976 sought (unsuccessfully) to be elected for the neighbouring Carmarthen Town West ward. Both seats were captured for the first time by Plaid Cymru.

2008
Plaid Cymru held both seats in 2008 Carmarthenshire County Council election, with Gareth O. Jones replacing Jeff Thomas who stood down.

2012
Plaid Cymru held both seats in 2012 with the sitting members again returned.

2017
At the May 2017 elections Labour's Ken Lloyd, a Carmarthen Town councillor, captured one of the Plaid Cymru seats.

References

Carmarthen
Wards of Dyfed
Former wards of Carmarthenshire